This is a list of notable people associated with Fordham University School of Law in New York City, New York, organized into rough professional areas and listed in alphabetical order.

Judges

 Vincent L. Briccetti '80, Judge, U.S. District Court for the Southern District of New York
 Thomas J. Brogan 1911, Chief Justice, Supreme Court of New Jersey
 John A. Byrnes 1923, Chief Justice, City Court
 Adrian P. Burke '30, Associate Judge, New York Court of Appeals
 Claire C. Cecchi '89, Judge, U.S. District Court for the District of New Jersey
 Denny Chin '78, Judge, U.S. Court of Appeals for the Second Circuit
 Albert Conway 1911, Chief Judge, New York Court of Appeals
 Catherine M. DiDomenico '89, Justice New York State Supreme Court
 Kevin Duffy '58, Judge, U.S. District Court for the Southern District of New York
 Claire Eagan '76, Chief Judge, U.S. District Court for the Northern District of Oklahoma
 Peter T. Farrell '25, judge who presided over the trial of bank robber Willie Sutton.
 Samuel M. Gold '24, Justice, New York State Supreme Court, 1950–72, instrumental in the creation of the Supreme Court's Family Part and President of the Association of Justices of the State of New York.
 Arthur Gonzalez '82, Judge, U.S. Bankruptcy Court (1995–2012); presided over Chrysler, Enron and WorldCom bankruptcies
 Dennis Reagan Hurley '66, Judge, U.S. District Court of the Eastern District of New York
 Irving Kaufman '31, Chief Judge, U.S. Court of Appeals for the Second Circuit
 John F. Keenan '54, Judge, U.S. District Court for the Southern District of New York
 Paul Joseph Kelly, Jr. '67, Judge, U.S. Court of Appeals for the Tenth Circuit
 John J. Leo '81, Judge, New York State Supreme Court
 Joseph M. McLaughlin '59, Judge, U.S. Court of Appeals for the Second Circuit (1990 – August 8, 2013)
 Kevin Michael Moore '76, Judge, U.S. District Court for the Southern District of Florida
 William Hughes Mulligan '42, Judge, U.S. Court of Appeals for the Second Circuit (1971–1981)
 Robert S. Ondrovic ‘85, Justice New York State Supreme Court
 Marilyn Hall Patel '63, Judge, U.S. District Court for the Northern District of California
 Loretta A. Preska '73, Chief Judge, U.S. District Court for the Southern District of New York
Jaime Rios '77, Judge, Queens County Supreme Court
 Cathy Seibel '85, Judge, U.S. District Court for the Southern District of New York

Politicians

 Thomas Alfano '84, member of the New York State Assembly (1996–present)
 Vincent H. Auleta (1912), member of the New York State Assembly (1926–1930)
 Steve Bellone, '99, Babylon, New York town supervisor, Suffolk County Executive
Alessandra Biaggi '12, New York State Senator
 John Bonacic '68, New York State Senator
 Kathleen Brown, California State Treasurer and unsuccessful gubernatorial candidate
 Steven Derounian '42, member of the U.S. House of Representatives (1953–1965), Justice, New York Supreme Court (1969–1981)
 Dan Donovan '88, member of the U.S. House of Representatives (2015–2019)
 Francis E. Dorn '35, member of the U.S. House of Representatives (1953–1961)
 Geraldine Ferraro '60, member of the U.S. House of Representatives (1979–1985) and first woman Vice Presidential candidate of a major political party
 Joseph F. Finnegan '31, fourth Director of the Federal Mediation and Conciliation Service, from 1955 to 1961.
 Vito Fossella '93, member of the U.S. House of Representatives (1997–2009)
 Peter Hatch' 01, Commissioner of the New York City Department of Consumer and Worker Protection
 Louis Heller '26, special deputy assistant attorney general, New York State Senator, member of the United States Congress, Judge of New York City Special Sessions Court, Justice of New York City City Court, and judge on New York Supreme Court.
 Vincent R. Impellitteri '24, Mayor of New York City (1950–1953)
 Andrew Lanza '92, New York State Senator
 Louis J. Lefkowitz, '25, New York State Attorney General, New York State Assemblyman
 Ralph J. Marino '54, Majority Leader, New York State Senate (1988–1994)
 William C. McCreery (1919), American lawyer and member of the New York State Assembly 
Joseph McGoldrick (1929), NYC Comptroller and NY State Residential Rent Control Commissioner, lawyer, and professor
 Jerrold Nadler, '78, member of the U.S. House of Representatives (1993–present)
 Edward T. O'Connor, Jr., New Jersey State Senator.
 Bill Owens '74, member of the U.S. House of Representatives (2009–present)
 Cesar Perales '65, Secretary of State of New York (2011–2016)
 Phelps Phelps '25, 38th Governor of American Samoa and US Ambassador to the Dominican Republic
 Adam Clayton Powell IV, member of the New York State Assembly (2000–2010)
 Thomas Vincent Quinn '24, member of the U.S. House of Representatives (1949–1951)
 Norman M. Robertson, New Jersey State Senator
 Bernard M. Shanley, Deputy Chief of Staff and White House Counsel to President Dwight Eisenhower
 Aravella Simotas '02, member of the New York State Assembly
 Madeline Singas, '91, District Attorney, Nassau County, New York
 Dean Skelos '75, Majority Leader of the New York State Senate
 William F. Smith 1922, member of the New York State Assembly
 Thomas Suozzi, U.S. Representative for New York's 3rd congressional district, former Nassau County Executive and former 2006 New York gubernatorial candidate
 Austin Joseph Tobin '28, executive director of the Port of New York Authority, the precursor to the Port Authority of New York and New Jersey, 1942–1972
 Peter Vallone, Jr., member of the New York City Council (2002–present)
 Peter Vallone, Sr. '59, first and longtime Speaker of the New York City Council
 Malcolm Wilson '36, Governor of New York (1973–1975)

Other legal practitioners
 Raymond A. Brown, criminal defense lawyer who represented high-profile clients
 Eunice Carter, '21, first female African-American assistant district attorney for the state of New York, pivotal in the prosecution of Lucky Luciano
 Robert J. Cleary '80, United States Attorney for the District of New Jersey and lead prosecutor in the Unabomber case
 Robert Stephan Cohen, '62, senior partner at Cohen Clair Lans Greifer & Thorpe LLP
 Janice Cole, '79, U.S. Attorney for the Eastern District of North Carolina
 John Feerick, '61, Dean, Fordham University School of Law (1982–2002)
 Christopher Ferrara, founder of the American Catholic Lawyers Association and contributing editor of The Remnant Newspaper
 Marc Ferzan, '92, Director, Governor of New Jersey's Office of Recovery and Rebuilding
 Pat Foye, '81, former Chairman and CEO, and President of the New York Metropolitan Transportation Authority (MTA) and Executive Director of the Port Authority of New York and New Jersey
 Ira Gollobin, civil rights attorney
 Matthew Hiltzik, attorney and PR consultant
 William G. Hundley, '50, criminal defense attorney who represented high-profile clients; former prosecutor in U.S. Justice Department 
 Shana Madoff, '95, compliance officer and attorney at securities firm of Ponzi schemer Bernard Madoff
 William Meagher, '27, senior partner at the law firm Skadden, Arps, Slate, Meagher & Flom
 John N. Mitchell, '38, US Attorney General (1969–1972)
 Archibald R. Murray, '60, first African-American president, New York State Bar Association; Commissioner, Division of Criminal Justice Services; Attorney-in-Chief, Legal Aid Society
 Finbarr O'Neill, '76, former CEO of J.D. Power, Mitsubishi Motors North America, Hyundai Motor America
 Thomas Puccio, '69, Abscam prosecutor and defense attorney for Claus von Bülow
 Ruth Whitehead Whaley, '24, first female African-American lawyer admitted in New York (1924)
Kei Komuro, law clerk of Lowenstein Sandler and Husband of former Japanese princess Mako Komuro,received Martin Scholarship in 2019

Sports

 Bernie Fliegel, '38, professional basketball player
 Vincent Fuller, former American football player and current attorney
 John Mara, '79, President and COO, New York Giants
 Bob Olin, boxer, World Light Heavyweight champion 
 Walter O'Malley, '30, owner of the Brooklyn Dodgers; moved the team from Brooklyn to Los Angeles
 Howie Roseman, General Manager of the Philadelphia Eagles

Other

 Fred Ahlert, composer and songwriter
 Kevin Burke, '77, Chairman, President, and CEO of Consolidated Edison
 Christopher Cuomo, '95, Emmy Award-winning correspondent formerly for CNN and ABC News; news anchor, New Day
 Doug Davis, '97, entertainment lawyer, Grammy Award winning producer and philanthropist
 Jonathon Edington, '04, convicted in the stabbing death of Barry James
 Jack Ford, co-anchor of Court TV's Banfield & Ford: Courtside, Peabody Award and two-time Emmy Award winner
 Jim Gianopulos, '76, Co-Chairman and CEO of Fox Filmed Entertainment
 Matthew Hiltzik, '97, CEO and President of Hiltzik Strategies, a strategic consulting and communications firm
 John N. Irwin II, US Deputy Secretary of State, US Ambassador to France
 Thomas J. Kelly, '62, United States Army soldier and a recipient of the Congressional Medal of Honor, the US military's highest decoration, for his actions in World War II
 Brian William Koppelman, '95, filmmaker, screenwriter
 G. Gordon Liddy, '57, Watergate conspirator, nationally syndicated radio talk show host
 Ira Brad Matetsky, '87, business litigation and real estate lawyer and prominent Wikipedian
 Lara Jill Miller, '91, actress, best known for her role as Samantha "Sam" Kanisky on the TV sitcom Gimme a Break!

References

Fordham University
 
Fordham University School of Law